Nathan Vitré (born 3 March 1998) is a French professional footballer who plays as a left-back for Championnat National 2 club Moulins Yzeure.

Career
Vitré made his professional debut for Clermont in a 3–1 Coupe de la Ligue loss to Troyes on 28 August 2018.

References

External links
 
 

1998 births
Living people
People from Cholet
Sportspeople from Maine-et-Loire
French footballers
Association football fullbacks
Clermont Foot players
Ligue 2 players
Championnat National 2 players
Championnat National 3 players
Footballers from Pays de la Loire